Fiey is a surname. Notable people with the surname include:

 Fabien Fiey (born 1994), or KioShiMa, French Counter-Strike player
 Jean Maurice Fiey (1914–1995), French Dominican Father and prominent Church historian and Syriacist

See also
 Fey (name)